Frank Gomez Jr. (13 February 1909 – 31 January 1961) was an Australian rules footballer who played with Essendon in the Victorian Football League (VFL).		

His father, Frank Gomez, played one game for Carlton in 1901.

Notes

External links 
		

1909 births
1961 deaths
Australian rules footballers from Victoria (Australia)
Essendon Football Club players